The Ambassador of Malaysia to the Arab Republic of Egypt is the head of Malaysia's diplomatic mission to Egypt. The position has the rank and status of an Ambassador Extraordinary and Plenipotentiary and is based in the Embassy of Malaysia, Cairo.

List of heads of mission

Ambassadors to Egypt

See also
 Egypt–Malaysia relations

References 

 
Egypt
Malaysia